The Concert is a 1909 German comedic play by Hermann Bahr that was adapted for the American stage by Leo Ditrichstein.

The German play debuted at the Lessing Theater in Berlin on December 23, 1909.  In America, it had a 264 performance run at the Belasco Theatre on Broadway from October 4, 1910 to May 1911.  It also had a 1911 run in London.

The success of the American adaptation has been credited to Ditrichstein's work more than the original play.  As was successful with other adaptations of foreign works in this period, Ditrichstein removed any trace of foreignness from the play and created a show expertly honed for commercial success.

Broadway cast
 Gabor Arany by Leo Ditrichstein
 Dr. Dallas by William Morris
 McGinnis by John W. Cape
 Helen Arany by Janet Beecher
 Flora Dallas by Jane Grey
 Eva Wharton by Alice L. Pollock
 Mrs. McGinnis by Belle Theodore
 Miss Merk by Catherine Proctor
 Fanny Martin by Edith Cartwright
 Claire Flower by Margaret Bloodgood
 Natale Moncrieff by Adel. Barrett
 Edith Gordon by Cora Witherspoon
 Georgine Roland by Elsie Glynn
 Laura Sage by Edna Griffin
 Mrs. Lennon-Roch by Kath. Tyndall

See also
 The Concert (1921 film)
 The Concert (1931 film)

References

External links
 

1909 plays
Comedy plays
German plays adapted into films